Ramnad V. Raghavan (19 June 1927 – 21 November 2009) was a player of the mridangam. He was born in Madurai, Tamil Nadu, India, to P. Vaidyanatha Ayyar of Kooniyur, Tirunelveli district, and Brhannayaki. His elder brother Ramnad Krishnan was a famous Carnatic vocalist. 

Beginning in 1970, he taught for many years at Wesleyan University in Connecticut, United States. He was also a key initiator for the  Cleveland Thyagaraja Aradhana. He retired around 2000 and moved to Chennai, India. He died on 21 November 2009 at the age of 82 in Chennai. 
His students have included Glen Velez, Jamey Haddad, David Nelson, Patricia Shehan Campbell, Frank Bennett, and Joseph M. Getter.

References

External links
Ramnad V. Raghavan page from David Nelson site
Ramnad Raghavan page

See also
T. Ranganathan
S. Ramanathan

1927 births
2009 deaths
Indian male classical musicians
Musicians from Madurai
Mridangam players
Wesleyan University faculty
Place of birth missing
20th-century Indian musicians
20th-century drummers
20th-century Indian male singers
20th-century Indian singers
Shakti (band) members